Lake Tomahawk is an unincorporated census-designated place located in the town of Lake Tomahawk, Oneida County, Wisconsin, United States. Lake Tomahawk has a post office with ZIP code 54539. As of the 2010 census, its population was 228.

History
Lake Tomahawk was originally called Tomahawk Lake, and under the latter name was platted in 1892. The community took its name from nearby Tomahawk Lake. The name of the post office was changed from Tomahawk Lake to Lake Tomahawk in 1928.

References

Census-designated places in Oneida County, Wisconsin
Census-designated places in Wisconsin